Ortignano Raggiolo is a comune (municipality) in the Province of Arezzo in the Italian region Tuscany, located about  southeast of Florence and about  northwest of Arezzo.

Ortignano Raggiolo borders the following municipalities: Bibbiena, Castel Focognano, Castel San Niccolò, Loro Ciuffenna, Poppi.

References

External links

 Official website

Cities and towns in Tuscany